Mehzeb Rahman Chowdhury is a Bangladeshi author, inventor, instructor, journalist, criminologist, criminal law barrister, social sciences researcher and filmmaker. His journalism works are featured in various international publications such as the Daily Mail, The Independent, The Conversation, Forensic Magazine, Sci-Fi Generation, Space.com, and Netzpiloten Magazin. He is also known for his invention of the MABMAT Crime Scene Imaging Rover.

Biography

Early life 
Mehzeb Chowdhury was born in Dhaka, Bangladesh on 31 January 1987. He is the only son of journalists Matiur Rahman Chowdhury, and Mahbuba Chowdhury.

Education 
In 2009, he completed his LLB (Hons) from the University of London. He did his postgraduate diploma in Law (PGDL) from Northumbria University in 2010. He came to the UK to take the bar exam in 2010, and then went back to Bangladesh to work at a law firm for two years. In 2020, he earned a Ph.D. in Applied Social Sciences from Durham University.

Career 
Chowdhury was a correspondent for Goal.com from 2007 to 2009. During that period, he also worked as a staff writer for The Daily New Age. He worked for ESPN and served as an editor for Vital Football Newcastle till 2010. Then he was a lecturer at the University of London (External Programmes), a teaching associate at Durham University, senior lecturer at UWE Bristol. He currently works as an assistant professor of Policing at Northumbria University. He is a member of the Bar Council of England and Wales and Bangladesh Bar Council.

Chowdhury's research has been published in various countries and languages and has been featured in museum exhibits, including at the National Science and Media Museum in Bradford, and the Museum of Science and Industry in Manchester. Chowdhury’s published works in crime scene investigation include the definition and roles of scene investigators, examination of crime scene quality control, freedom of information and data freedom mechanisms within UK police forces, and extrapolations of the future of police, policing and advanced AI systems.

In addition to his work in forensic science and crime scene analysis, Chowdhury is also a cinematographer. He worked in this profession for the feature film Redemption in 2017, directed by Edward Collier. His other award-winning films have screened at over fifty international festivals, and he has been a member of the British Academy of Film and Television Arts (BAFTA) Crew and Connect programmes since 2018. Chowdhury is also a Founding Director of the South Asian Film, Television, and Arts Collective (SAFTAC), a community of South Asian talents who help each other. Mehzeb is currently writing the screenplay for his debut feature film. He is also an actor, last appearing in the music video for UK-based rock band Martha.

Chowdhury was a seminal speaker at the World Police Summit 2022 and often a participant in technology conferences and live events in the UK.

Chowdhury's invention of the MABMAT, a Mars rover-like device that aids in crime scene analysis, was developed in 2016 and has been recognized for modernizing the field of forensic science. It has been featured in many major media outlets such as The Atlantic, the Discovery Channel, Business Insider, Huffington Post, Wired, and CNN. Despite not having any engineering experience, Chowdhury was inspired by the Mars rover, which he saw on a NASA channel, and was struck by the idea that a similar device could be used in crime scenes. The name MABMAT was created using the acronyms of his parents' initials.

Among Mehzeb Chowdhury’s other inventions includes a holographic projection system called Augmented Reality Testimony System for Vulnerable Witnesses (ARTS), which facilitates victims of sexual abuse to remotely appear in the witness box without having to ever enter the courtroom. This technology shields vulnerable witnesses from the stress of giving testimony in person while ensuring that the jury sees the most realistic projection of the testimony. He has also theorized use of video game technologies such as Xbox Kinect to scan evidential artefacts and preserve a visual record of objects found at crime scenes.

Chowdhury have worked on the effects of isolation in space, and the characteristics and challenges of crime scenes on space-bound vessels and orbital crafts. His poetry has been published in anthologies in different parts of the world, most recently in Poems of Hope by Jessica Clark and Stephanie Hanson.

Music 
Chowdhury formed the rock band Megalithic with long-term collaborator Alex McDonnell in 2014.  Megalithic would go on to release their first studio album ‘The Unnamed’ in February 2018, receiving positive feedbacks.

Personal life 
Chowdhury resides in the United Kingdom. He marks Leonardo da Vinci as his inspiration. In an interview with The Daily Star, he stated: “I idolised Leonardo da Vinci, who was an inventor, painter, sculptor, and an engineer. I was fascinated by all his talents, and a few years later, I worked on my repertoire of skills".

References

Year of birth missing (living people)
Living people
Place of birth missing (living people)
Nationality missing
Alumni of the University of London
Alumni of Northumbria University
Alumni of Durham University
British sportswriters
Academics of the University of London
Academics of Durham University
Academics of the University of the West of England, Bristol
Academics of Northumbria University
British criminologists
British cinematographers
21st-century British inventors
Bangladeshi cinematographers